Hypnotize is the fifth studio album by American heavy metal band System of a Down. It was released on November 22, 2005, six months after the release of its companion album Mezmerize, and one year following the album's completion. Mezmerize and Hypnotize both debuted at number one on the Billboard 200 albums chart, making the band one of only four acts (the others being The Beatles, Tupac Shakur, and DMX) to achieve this with two albums in the same year, and the only American band to do so.

As of 2023, Hypnotize is the latest studio album by System of a Down, who had entered a four-year hiatus in 2006, and the band did not release new music until 2020.

Reception

Hypnotize received generally positive reviews. It opened at number one on the Billboard 200, with 320,000 copies sold in the first week. The album also debuted at number 1 on the Canadian Albums Chart, selling 47,000 copies in its first week. The album was certified gold and platinum by the RIAA on December 13, 2005. Since its release, Hypnotize has sold 8 million copies worldwide.

Entertainment Weekly (No. 851, p. 100) - "[T]hey're flaunting a heretofore underexplored sensitive side, offsetting their trademark stampeding riffology with flashes of delicate lyricism." - Grade: B+

Rolling Stone (No. 988, p. 117) - 3.5 out of 5 stars - "Hell immediately runneth over on Malakian's scoured-staccato guitars and Dolmayan's furious hammering."

Spin (p. 62) - Ranked #20 in Spins "40 Best Albums of 2005".

Uncut (p. 109) - 3 stars out of 5 - "System succeed through their skill at wielding complex, progressive heaviness in a pop context."

Track listing
All lyrics written by Daron Malakian and Serj Tankian, except where noted. All music written by Malakian, except where noted.

Notes
The album was initially going to start with a Middle Eastern-style instrumental track entitled "Hezze", which Malakian stated was one of his favorite songs on the record prior to its release. It was dropped at the last minute because the group wanted to open the album with a heavy song, and because the band felt it was incongruous with the other songs on the album. However, during live performances of "Mr. Jack", Malakian would yell "Yalla hezze" (English translation: "Come on, shake!") after the first chorus. A funk/jazzy guitar instrumental, is then played after.

"The Charade", originally titled "Charades", a song written and eventually released by Tankian in 2010, was being considered to appear on Mezmerize or Hypnotize, as footage of the band rehearsing it exists on YouTube. The reasons it was not featured on neither Mezmerize nor Hypnotize remain unknown.

DualDisc edition – DVD side
 Entire album in enhanced stereo
 The Recording of Mezmerize / Hypnotize
 "B.Y.O.B." and "Question!" videos

Personnel 

System of a Down
 Serj Tankian – vocals, keyboards
 Daron Malakian – vocals, guitars, bass (uncredited), keyboards (uncredited)
 Shavo Odadjian – bass
 John Dolmayan – drums

Vocal duties
 "Attack": Serj Tankian (main), Daron Malakian (second voice)
 "Dreaming": Tankian and Malakian (both main)
 "Kill Rock 'n Roll": Tankian and Malakian (both main)
 "Hypnotize": Tankian and Malakian (both main)
 "Stealing Society": Tankian and Malakian (both main)
 "Tentative": Tankian (main), Malakian (second voice)
 "U-Fig": Tankian (main - verses & chorus)  Malakian (main - chorus)
 "Holy Mountains": Tankian (main), Malakian (second voice)
 "Vicinity of Obscenity": Tankian
 "She's Like Heroin": Malakian (main), Tankian (second voice)
 "Lonely Day":  Malakian (main), Tankian (second voice)
 "Soldier Side": Tankian and Malakian (both main)

Production
 Produced by Rick Rubin and Daron Malakian
 Mixed by Andy Wallace
 Engineered by David Schiffman
 Editing by Jason Lader and Dana Neilsen
 Assistant engineer: Phillip Broussard
 All artwork by Vartan Malakian
 Design: System of a Down and Brandy Flower
 String arrangement: Serj Tankian and Marc Mann
 Mix Pro Tools engineer: John O'Mahony
 Mix assistant engineers: Steve Sisco (Soundtrack) and Joe Peluso (Enterprise)
 Album production coordinator: Lindsay Chase / Braden Asher
 Recording location: The Mansion in Laurel Canyon, Los Angeles, and Akademie Mathematique of Philosophical Sound Research, Los Angeles
 Mixed at Soundtrack Studios, New York City and Enterprise Studios, Los Angeles
 Mastered by Vlado Meller at Sony Music Studios, New York City

Charts

Weekly charts

Year-end charts

Certifications

References

2005 albums
Albums produced by Rick Rubin
American Recordings (record label) albums
Columbia Records albums
System of a Down albums
Albums produced by Daron Malakian
Albums recorded at The Mansion (recording studio)